The African Exploration Mining and Finance Corporation (AEMFC) is a state-controlled mining business in South Africa.

The AEMFC was launched by Jacob Zuma, the former president of South Africa, prompting concerns that the state might attempt to nationalise parts of the mining industry.

First established in 1944, it lay dormant for years, before beginning activities in 2007. It has been granted mining and prospecting rights, in competition with other mining companies. AEMFC is, officially, subsidiary to the Central Energy Fund.

In February 2011, the AEMFC launched a coal mining project in Mpumalanga, which is expected to produce 1.68 million tons of coal per year.

, AEMFC was still loss-making, but gets interest-free loans from the Central Energy Fund (R209M as of 2016). Performance of its coal, limestone, and uranium mines has been disappointing.  It moved into profit, by March 2013 stating a profit of R77M per year, and an equity of R490K, despite a loss of 54 409 tonnes of uninsured coal which was burned.

References

Mining companies of South Africa
Non-renewable resource companies established in 1944
Coal companies of South Africa
Government-owned companies of South Africa
1943 establishments in South Africa
History of mining in South Africa